Hokkien pop, also known as Taiwanese Hokkien popular music, T-pop, Tai-pop, Minnan Pop and Taiwanese song, is a popular music genre sung in Taiwanese Hokkien and produced mainly in Taiwan. Hokkien pop is most popular amongst Hoklo people in Taiwan, Mainland China, and the Overseas Chinese in Southeast Asia.

Terminology
The historical origin of Hokkien pop comes from a Japanese enka base instead of a Chinese shidaiqu base. Because it developed from traditional Japanese enka, it has become diverse in its varieties.

History

Origin
Under Japanese rule (1895–1945), Taiwanese music continued and developed its new form from the previous period. By the 1930s, vinyl records of traditional music, such as Taiwanese opera, Peking opera, Nanguan, and Beiguan were popular.

A new business model of the popular music industry emerged when Kashiwano Seijiro, who led the Taiwan branch of Columbia Record Company, started to market their records in new ways, such as marketing songs with silent movies. Kashiwano also recruited and made popular musical talents such as Teng Yu-hsien, Yao Tsan-fu, Su Tung, Lee Lim-chhiu, Sun-sun. They produced important titles such as Bāng Chhun-hong (Longing for the Spring Breeze) and The Torment of a Flower (Flower of a Rainy Night). The Taiwan branch of Victor Records was an equally competitive company, delegated by the influential Lin Ben Yuan Family and headed by Chang Fu-hsing. With talents such as Chen Ta-ju, Victor produced important titles such as White Peony.

This new business was led by a new generation born under Japanese rule. This generation received modern Japanese education at that time and was exposed to western musical styles and ideas. Some were active in the new music industry because of their interest in politics. Music helped them demonstrate their disapproval against the Japanese ruling and support of native culture.

However, Hokkien pop was soon set back. As Second Sino-Japanese War broke out in 1937, non-Japanese songs were banned, and talents were required to write songs (and change previous songs) for military propaganda. The situation worsened in 1941 when the Pacific War broke out. The bombings of Taiwan (called Formosa at the time) by the United States, poverty, and the shortage of raw materials hit the music industry hard, a situation which drove many talents away. This period ends with the end of World War II and the handover of Taiwan to the Republic of China in 1945.

1950s–1960s: Political interference and censorship
Taiwan's period of White Terror began after the February 28 Incident of 1947 and declaration of martial law in 1949. The Kuomintang had lost the Chinese Civil War and proclaimed Taipei as the temporary capital of the Republic of China. All facets of Taiwanese culture that were not of Han Chinese origin were under scrutiny. In particular, the government discouraged use of Taiwanese languages (see also Taiwanese Hokkien§Politics). As a result, native Taiwanese pop music was no longer in development.

In the 1960s, Taiwan Television was barred from airing more than two Taiwanese pop songs a day.

1980s: Lifting of martial law
By the early 1980s, Hokkien pop remained popular only among the older generations and working class; Mandopop had benefited from government promotion of Standard Chinese in gaining appeal with the younger generation. After the lifting of martial law in 1987, local Taiwanese culture was allowed to flourish, and major changes came to the content and social status of Tai-pop songs.

Blacklist Studio ventured release the first native Taiwanese album, entitled Song of Madness, in the Mandopop-dominated market of 1989.

One famous male singer from the 1980s is Chris Hung who is famous for One Little Umbrella; Hung also produces Taiwanese Christian song albums.

Fong Fei-fei is a famous Taiwanese singer from the 1970s who is a Mandarin pop singer, but also has albums in Taiwanese too.

Jody Chiang is Taiwan's most famous singer and is often referred to as the Queen of Taiwanese pop music.  She has many albums and compilations that date from the 1980s to the present. She can be referred to as the Taiwanese equivalent of Teresa Teng (below).

Stella Chang has produced albums entirely in Mandarin and entirely Taiwanese. She made her debut singing Taiwan's School campus songs and is a Mandarin pop singer, but branched out into contemporary Mandarin and Taiwanese songs to reflect her heritage.

Teresa Teng although of mainland Chinese heritage, is also known to have songs in Taiwanese. Unfortunately, these songs have not made it to CDs like her Japanese, Mandarin, and Cantonese songs have.  Although Teng is better known for her Mandarin albums, her songs were also influenced by Japanese Enka style and by older Taiwan min-ge songs.

Chen Ying-Git is a famous female singer of Taiwanese Hakka heritage, who has also produced albums from the 1980s through the 1990s like Jody Chiang. One of her famous songs is 海海人生. She sings a famous duet called 酒醉黑白話 with Taiwanese male singer Yu Tian, who also sings in Mandarin.

Other famous Taiwanese singers include Chang Hsiu-ching from Pingtung, who is famous for her song "Chhia-chām" (車站; Train Station) from the early 1990s.

1990s: Reintegration
In 1990, Lim Giong launched the first successful Taiwanese album under Rock Records. It also broke away the tradition by having a new-ballad style instead of the old-enka style.

In 1993, Taiwan's government opened up the broadcasting of TV or radio programs to languages other than Mandarin.

In the mid-1990s, Taiwan became the centre of one of the largest music industries in Asia. The country was the second largest music industry in Asia, in 1998 and 1999, after Japan, before falling to fourth in 2002 due to piracy. Piracy has caused domestic repertoire as a proportion of the market to fall to 50%, in 2001, from an all-time high of around 70%, in the 1990s. Sales of recorded music in Taiwan peaked in 1997, when sales reached US$442.3 million, but by 2008, revenue declined sharply to US$51 million, with piracy and illegal downloads to blame. Foreign songs began to dominate local repertoire for the first time in the mid-2000s, as they did in Hong Kong and Mainland China.

Present
The most popular Taiwanese female singer to date is Jody Chiang, who has numerous Taiwanese albums dating from the early 1980s. Another famous singer in Taiwan also known for her ballads is Chen Ying-git.

Current Hokkien pop music is becoming more influenced by Mandarin pop and include a wide variety of styles including rock, hip-hop, rap etc. Artists such as Wu Bai, Phil Chang, Jolin Tsai, Eric Moo, Show Lo, Mayday and Jay Chou are known to have Taiwanese songs in their albums. Recently, the rising popularity of the Hokkien pop diva Jeannie Hsieh has put Hokkien pop to a new level with her dance songs which are very different from the traditional Hokkien pop ballad sad songs. Also, Taiwanese black metal band Chthonic has risen to international prominence due to their nationalistic, anti-Chinese themes, as well as lead singer Freddy Lim's ascension into politics.

Certification

In August 1996, IFPI Taiwan (now Recording Industry Foundation in Taiwan) introduced gold and platinum awards for music recordings in Taiwan, along with the IFPI Taiwan Chart, which was suspended in September 1999.

Artists

See also
 Music of Taiwan
 Taiwanese hip hop

References

Bibliography

External links
 msnbc Taiwan history

 
Taiwanese pop
Pop music genres
Fusion music genres
Japanese styles of music